The 2018 Asian Beach Volleyball Championship was a beach volleyball event, that was held from 24 to 28 September, 2018 in Satun, Thailand.

Medal summary

Participating nations

Men

 (3)
 (3)
 (2)
 (2)
 (2)
 (2)
 (3)
 (3)
 (2)
 (1)
 (2)
 (2)
 (2)
 (1)
 (2)
 (4)

Women

 (2)
 (3)
 (2)
 (2)
 (1)
 (3)
 (3)
 (1)
 (1)
 (2)
 (5)
 (1)

Men's tournament

Qualification

Preliminary round

Pool A 

|}

Pool B 

|}

Pool C 

|}

Pool D 

|}

Pool E 

|}

Pool F 

|}

Pool G 

|}

Pool H 

|}

Knockout round

Women's tournament

Preliminary round

Pool A 

|}

Pool B 

|}

Pool C 

|}

Pool D 

|}

Pool E 

|}

Pool F 

|}

Pool G 

|}

Pool H 

|}

Knockout round

References
Men's Results
Women's Results
Report

External links
Official website

2018
Asian Championships
Beach volleyball
2018 Asian Beach Volleyball Championships